Words is a song by the Bee Gees, written by Barry, Robin and Maurice Gibb. The song reached No. 1 in Germany, Canada, Switzerland, and the Netherlands.

"Words" was the Bee Gees third UK top 10 hit, reaching number 8, and in a UK television special on ITV in December 2011 it was voted fourth in "The Nation's Favourite Bee Gees Song". The song has been recorded by many other artists, including hit versions by Rita Coolidge in 1978 and Boyzone in 1996. This was Boyzone's fifth single and their first number-one hit in the UK.

Writing 
Barry Gibb explains:

Robin Gibb: 

Barry said in 1996 on the VH1 Storytellers television show that it was written for their manager, Robert Stigwood.

Recording 
Words was recorded on 3 October 1967 along with "World" and the unreleased track "Maccleby's Secret" at the IBC Studios in London. The song featured vocals from only Barry and became his solo spot in concert for the remainder of the Bee Gees' career.

The recording sessions for "Words" were especially memorable for two members of the group, Barry explained:

"I remember the [first] session so clearly. Robin and I were in the studios at 9 o'clock in the morning, and Robin kept on falling asleep over the piano. I wanted him to write the piano part of the song and play it because I'm not much of a pianist, but he just couldn't keep his eyes open, so I ended up doing it myself".

"Words" was also the showcase for a new piano sound, as Maurice explained:

"We accidentally discovered the sound on 'Words'. When we were recording [it], after everyone had gone to lunch, I was sitting at the piano mucking about and I wrote a riff. I went upstairs and switched on the mike for the piano, and then I started playing about with the knobs in front of me. When I played the tape back, I had all these incredible compressed piano noises. Mike Claydon at IBC Studios, who engineered all our records, then said 'What the hell was that?' when he heard the piano sound. 'Come up here and listen to that sound'. It was just compression, but he didn't know what to call it then. I think he called it 'limited'. It made the piano sound like it was about 40 pianos playing at the same time and very, very thick. In 'Words' it was very beautiful but that sound on it made it sound like the LA Symphony on it. If you listen to all our records, the piano sound is on it.

According to sound engineer Damon Lyon-Shaw:

"I was the one that actually devised it, Mike Claydon was the one who took the credit for it, but i was actually piddling around at the time as his junior. On the mixer at the time, we had compressors, Maurice was playing at piano at the time, just piddling around [and] I started feeding the piano into a series of these compressors and then screwed them up until he got his lovely metallic sort of sucking sound, and that was the birth of that sound, Maurice, assumed it was Michael, so he took the credits.

Another sound engineer John Pantry offered to put things in a proper perspective:

"Well, Damon didn't make the compressor/limiter, and my memory is that we all used to use that sound once we discovered what it did to piano notes. As to who got there first is open to debate. The sound was unique because it was a home-made device that was made by a guy called Denis King".

Release 
The B-side for "Words" was "Sinking Ships", one of very few songs by the Bee Gees to feature all three brothers on lead vocals: Barry and Robin Gibb in the verses and Maurice Gibb on the song's chorus. The group performed this song on The Ed Sullivan Show in 1968, with Barry Gibb on vocals, Maurice Gibb on bass, Robin Gibb on piano, Vince on guitar and Colin on drums. On that performance Vince is playing Gibson ES-335, and Maurice is playing Rickenbacker 4001. Some backing vocals near the end are heard only on the mono mix used on the single, some compilations, and the Studio Albums 1967–1968 box set.

Mixes for "Words" suffered many different problems. Since it was originally used only as a single, no stereo mix was made until Atlantic wanted one for the Best of Bee Gees album in 1969, where it made its first appearance on LP. A stereo mix with the piano, bass and drums mixed down and the vocals pushed forward was made, which fans were dissatisfied with. Polydor in the UK instead chose to use the mono mix on their version of the album. In 1990, Bill Inglot prepared an improved stereo mix. While doing so, he noticed that two short sections of backing vocal near the end of the song were on the mono mix but not on the four-track master, as if Barry added them while the mono mix was made. The Studio Albums 1967–1968 used the original mono mix. As stated on the original single release, the song was featured in the film The Mini Mob (1968), where it was sung by Georgie Fame in an arrangement by Bill Shepherd.

"Words" debuted at No. 67 in Cashbox in the United States in the week of 20 January 1968. It was the Bee Gees' second UK Top 10 single after "Massachusetts".

Cash Box called it a "beautiful ballad line with a semi-soft, somewhat-rock sound obtained by the use of near classic piano, soaring strings and a pop percussion" and a "brilliant vocal lead."

Personnel 
 Barry Gibb – lead vocals, rhythm guitar
 Maurice Gibb – bass, piano, Mellotron
 Robin Gibb – harmony vocals
 Vince Melouney – rhythm guitar
 Colin Petersen – drums
 Bill Shepherd – orchestral arrangement

Charts

Weekly charts

Year-end charts

Boyzone version 

Irish boyband Boyzone covered "Words" and released is as the lead single from their second studio album, A Different Beat (1996). The single was their seventh single overall, becoming their first number-one hit in the UK and earning a platinum certification from the British Phonographic Industry.

Critical reception 
British magazine Music Week rated Boyzone's version of "Words" three out of five. The reviewer wrote, "Just when everyone has readied themselves for Boyzone's ascent to mega-stardom, they go and release their worst single to date. It will still be a massive hit, but this cover of The Bee Gees' 1968 hit is terribly uninspired."

Track listings 
 UK CD1
 "Words" (radio edit) – 3:55
 "The Price of Love" – 3:11
 "Words" (alternative mix) – 3:53

 UK CD2
 "Words" (radio edit) – 3:55
 "The Price of Love" – 3:11
 "What Can You Do for Me" – 2:59
 "Words" (alternative mix) – 3:53

 UK cassette single
 "Words" (radio edit) – 3:55
 "The Price of Love" – 3:11

Charts 

Weekly charts

Year-end charts

Certifications

Other versions 
The song was also recorded and performed live by Elvis Presley in 1969. It was included in the concert documentary and album Elvis: That's the Way It Is.

In 1979, country music singer Susie Allanson covered "Words" for her 1979 album Heart to Heart. Allanson's version was a number eight entry on Hot Country Songs that year.

In 2021, Barry Gibb and Dolly Parton recorded "Words" for Barry's 2021 album "Greenfields".

References 

1967 songs
1968 singles
1978 singles
1996 singles
2021 singles
Atco Records singles
Bee Gees songs
Boyzone songs
Dolly Parton songs
Irish Singles Chart number-one singles
Lill Lindfors songs
Number-one singles in Germany
Number-one singles in Scotland
Number-one singles in Switzerland
Polydor Records singles
Rita Coolidge songs
RPM Top Singles number-one singles
Song recordings produced by Phil Harding (producer)
Song recordings produced by Robert Stigwood
Songs written by Barry Gibb
Songs written by Maurice Gibb
Songs written by Robin Gibb
Susie Allanson songs
UK Singles Chart number-one singles